Joan Faulkner-Blake (30 January 1921 – 6 March 1990) was a professional New Zealand broadcaster in the mid to late twentieth century.

Life and career
Faulkner was born Joan Isabel Faulkner to Edward Ernest Faulkner and Rhoda Vera Faulkner (née White) in Cambridge, Waikato. After training as a journalist on the Dominion newspaper in Wellington and marrying Norman Blake at Napier in 1941, Faulkner spent much of World War II working for the Hawera Star in Taranaki. From 1944 to 1948, she and her husband leased the Dawson Falls Lodge, Egmont National Park, and there she gained an appreciation for the flora and fauna and traditional lore of the region’s National Parks.

After gaining overseas experience as a journalist, Faulkner returned to write syndicated columns in four main-centre newspapers for ten years in the 1950s.  Her "New Zealand Newsletters" found audiences in Britain, Canada, and South Africa from 1961 to 1985.  She ran a "Behind the Headlines" commentary on current affairs on NZBC commercial network for 14 years, gave regular book reviews on the YA stations, and for 11 years was a regular panellist on Sunday Supplement.

She edited education programmes on the National parks of New Zealand and the legends of Lake Taupo and Mount Taranaki/Egmont, which are still available today, and in the 1970s produced a documentary series for Radio New Zealand that looked at the legend of the mountains and traditions surrounding them. She gave many workshops and courses on writing and journalism, and she inspired the creation of writers' groups at Stratford and New Plymouth. In 1971, she was named "New Zealand Woman of the Year".

References
Obituary Daily News 9 March 1990 by Shirley Bourke Linda Blake, Queenstown (daughter)

1921 births
1990 deaths
New Zealand television presenters
New Zealand women television presenters
New Zealand television journalists
New Zealand women journalists
People from Cambridge, New Zealand